Cancer (♋︎) (Latin for "crab") is the fourth astrological sign in the zodiac, originating from the constellation of Cancer. It spans from 90° to 120° celestial longitude. Under the tropical zodiac, the Sun transits this area between approximately June 22 and July 22.

In astrology, Cancer is the cardinal sign of the Water trigon, which is made up of Cancer, Pisces, and Scorpio. It is one of the six negative signs, and its ruling planet is the Moon. Though some depictions of Cancer feature a lobster or crayfish, the sign is most often represented by the crab, based on the Karkinos. Cancer's opposite sign is Capricorn.

Background

Cancer is the fourth sign of the zodiac, which the sun enters at the summer solstice in the Northern Hemisphere, on approximately June 21. Those who are born from approximately June 21 to July 22 (depending upon the year) are born under Cancer. Individuals born during these dates, depending on which system of astrology they subscribe to, may be called "Cancerians". Cancer is a northern sign, and its opposite sign is Capricorn. Cancer is a cardinal sign.

Water is the element associated with Cancer, and, alongside Scorpio and Pisces, it forms the water trigon. The water trigon is one of four elemental trigons in the zodiac, with the other three being fire, earth, and air. When a trigon is influential, it is said to affect changes on earth. Cancer is said to be the house of Neptune and the exaltation of Jupiter, both astronomical bodies   over those born under Cancer. Its ruling planet is the Moon. Due to the negative associations of the word "Cancer" with the disease of the same name, some astrologers refer to persons born under this sign as "moon children".

Divine associations with Cancer in Renaissance astrology are Luna/Diana, both goddesses that represent the Moon, Cancer's ruling planet.

In Hindu astrology, the sign of Cancer is named Karka and its ruler is Moon.

Early history
"Cancer" is an ancient word of Indo-European origin, derived from a root meaning "to scratch." In ancient Egypt, the sign of Cancer was conceived as a scarab beetle, while in Mesopotamia it was represented by a turtle. In each case, the animal representative of the sign was perceived as "pushing" the sun across the heavens, initiating the summer solstice.

Latin  is the generic word for 'crab'. According to Greek myth, the symbol of Cancer—often a crab, though sometimes a lobster—is based on the Karkinos (Greek: "Cancer"), a crab crushed under the foot of Heracles, and whose remains were placed in the sky by Hera, forming the Cancer constellation. In Roman variations of the story, it is Juno—Hera's counterpart in Roman mythology—who places the crab in the sky. Naturalist Richard Hinckley Allen, in 1899, deemed Cancer the "most inconspicuous figure in the zodiac," adding that its mythology "apologizes for its being there by the story that when the Crab was crushed by Hercules, for pinching his toes during a contest with the Hydra in the Marsh of Lerna, Juno exalted it to the sky."

In the arts
During the Middle Ages, the zodiacal symbol of Cancer was included in devotional books and incorporated into monumental sculptures. The depiction of Cancer as a crab is most prevalent in Mediterranean and Western European art.

In Dante Alighieri's Paradiso, he makes reference to Cancer, writing:

Cancer is figured in Giovanni Maria Falconetto's 1517 painting, Cancer, as the guardian of the city of Verona. The Cancer symbol is also depicted in Agostino di Duccio's sculpture View of Rimini Under the Sign of Cancer (1450). In Giorgio Vasari's fresco, the Chamber of Fortune, Cancer is represented in the northern compartment of the ceiling, pictured by Diana, holding the moon, along with a crab.

Gallery

See also

Astronomical symbols
Chinese zodiac
Circle of stars
Cusp (astrology)
Elements of the zodiac

References

Sources

 Longitude of Sun, apparent geocentric ecliptic of date, interpolated to find time of crossing 0°, 30°....

External links

 Warburg Institute Iconographic Database (over 300 medieval and early modern images of Cancer) 

Western astrological signs
Mythological aquatic creatures
Mythological arthropods